Peter Harcourt D’Arcy Lock (born 2 August 1944) was the Archdeacon of Rochester from 2000 until 2009.

He was educated at King's College London and ordained in 1969. He began his ministry with curacies in Meopham, Wigmore and Gillingham.  He held incumbencies in, Fawkham and Hartley, Dartford, and Bromley; and was a residentiary canon of Rochester Cathedral from 2000 to 2009.

References

1944 births
Alumni of King's College London
Archdeacons of Rochester
Living people